The Fa language, Lefa (also Fak or Lefa), is one of the Bantu languages of Cameroon.

References

Bafia languages
Languages of Cameroon